Echinocardium australe, or the New Zealand heart urchin is a sea urchin of the family Loveniidae, endemic to New Zealand. Length is up to 40 mm.

References
 Miller M & Batt G, Reef and Beach Life of New Zealand, William Collins (New Zealand) Ltd, Auckland, New Zealand 1973
 

Echinoderms of New Zealand
Spatangoida
Animals described in 1855